Glavkino is a film studio in Russia. The studio includes a self-titled TV Movie complex, a production company, and lab scenarios.

The Concern was founded in 2008 by Fyodor Bondarchuk, Konstantin Ernst and Ilya Bachurin. 50% of the concern is owned by Fyodor Bondarchuk, Konstantin Ernst, Ilya Bachurin and "Uralsib" Bank, another 50% is owned by the private investor Vitaly Golovachov. Glavkino complex is located in the Krasnogorsk municipal district of Moscow region. The first movie filmed by Glavkino was August Eighth.

Filmography 
2012: August Eighth / Август Восьмого

References

External links 

 Glavkino official site
 Glavkino in IMDb

Russian film studios
Film production companies of Russia
Companies based in Moscow